A synopsis is a brief summary of the major points of a subject or written work or story, either as prose or as a table; an abridgment or condensation of a work.

Synopsis or synopsys may also refer to:
 Video synopsis, an approach to create a short video summary of a long video
 Transcript poetry, a data collection method for qualitative research

See also
 Synopsys, an electronic design automation company based in Mountain View, California
 Synopsia (disambiguation)
 Synoptic (disambiguation)